Dan Moriarty may refer to:

 Dan Moriarty (cricketer) (born 1999), South African cricketer
 Dan Moriarty (footballer, born 1895) (1895–1982), Australian rules footballer in the (then) South Australian Football League
 Dan Moriarty (footballer, born 1875) (1875–1903), Australian rules footballer in the Victorian Football League